Newman Alexander "Nat" Townsend (May 1, 1882 – April 11, 1951) was a college football player and attorney.

Early years
Newman Townsend was born on May 1, 1882 in Raynham, North Carolina to the reverend Jackson Townsend and his wife Sarah Melissa Oliver. The Townsend family had emigrated from the parish of Raynham in Norfolk, England.

University of North Carolina
Townsend graduated from the University of North Carolina in 1905, and was a prominent member of its football team, selected for All-Southern teams in 1904. John Longer de Saulles disputed those who would call his year lucky, "Townsend, of Carolina, has attrackted (sic) more attention than any Southern end during the season. It was Townsend's work for Carolina that defeated Virginia Polytechnic and it was his good office that took advantage of Pollard misplay in Richmond, giving Carolina her touchdown. These accidents happen repeatedly only with those who are playing up to the limit, and while the newspapers may call his playing accidental, it is impossible to disassociate these accidents from earnest intelligent and successful endeavors."

Career in law
Townsend served as executive counsel to another former football star, governor Oliver Max Gardner, in 1930–31.

References

1882 births
1951 deaths
American football ends
Players of American football from North Carolina
All-Southern college football players
North Carolina Tar Heels football players
University of North Carolina School of Law alumni
People from Robeson County, North Carolina
American people of English descent